Radical 190 or radical hair meaning "hair" is one of the 8 Kangxi radicals (214 radicals in total) composed of 10 strokes.

In the Kangxi Dictionary, there are 243 characters (out of 49,030) to be found under this radical.

 is also the 188th indexing component in the Table of Indexing Chinese Character Components predominantly adopted by Simplified Chinese dictionaries published in mainland China.

Evolution

Derived characters

Literature

External links

Unihan Database - U+9ADF

190
188